Girija Devi was an Indian politician. She was elected to the Lok Sabha, lower house of the Parliament of India from Maharajganj , Bihar as member of the Janata Dal.

References

External links
 Official biographical sketch in Parliament of India website

India MPs 1991–1996
1941 births
Lok Sabha members from Bihar
Janata Dal politicians
Living people